Stanislav Tsonkov (born September 16, 1991) is a Bulgarian professional basketball Guard who currently plays for New Basket Agropoli.

External links
Eurobasket Profile
RealGM Profile
BGBasket Profile
FIBAEurope Profile
BalkanLeague Profile

References

1991 births
Living people
BC Beroe players
BC Balkan Botevgrad players
Bulgarian men's basketball players
Guards (basketball)
Sportspeople from Varna, Bulgaria